Valentin Cabbigat Dimoc is a Filipino Bishop and the current Vicar-Apostolic of the Apostolic Vicariate of Bontoc-Lagawe since 2015.

Early life and education
He was born on February 14, 1969, in Lagawe, Ifugao, during Valentine's Day, henceforth his name is Valentin. He is a native from the Tuwali tribe. He studied philosophy and theology at Immaculate Conception School of Theology in Vigan City. He also holds a Master's Degree in development management from the Asian Institute of Management in Makati City.

Career
Due to his indigenous heritage, he was appointed as the chairman of the Episcopal Commission on Indigenous People, an office of the Catholic Bishops' Conference of the Philippines that seeks to promote social welfare among Filipino indigenous people. He has served as rector of the Holy Rosary Mission, Kayan; the Holy Family Mission, Hapao; the St. Mary Magdalene Mission, Lagawe; and the Good Shepherd Mission, Hapid; and as director of the Kataguan Centre, Lagawe. He is currently director of the Centre for Social Action and Development of the apostolic vicariate of Bontoc-Lagawe. In 2015, he was appointed by Pope Francis as Vicar-Apostolic of Bontoc- Lagawe titular bishop of Bapara.

References

1969 births
Living people
21st-century Roman Catholic bishops in the Philippines
People from Ifugao